Taborda is a surname. People with the surname include:

Catarina Taborda, Bissau-Guinean politician
César Taborda, Argentine football goalkeeper
Cristián Taborda, Argentine football striker
Éric Taborda, French footballer
Facundo Taborda, Argentine footballer
Federico Taborda, Argentine footballer
Gonzalo Taborda, Argentine footballer
Jazmín Taborda, Ecuadorian road cyclist
José da Cunha Taborda, Portuguese painter and architect
Juan Taborda, Spanish conquistador
Pedro Taborda, Portuguese football goalkeeper
Sebastián Taborda, Uruguayan footballer
Tarzan Taborda, Portuguese professional wrestler
Tato Taborda, Brazilian composer and pianist